Njoge is an administrative ward in the Kongwa district of the Dodoma Region of Tanzania. According to the 2002 census, the ward has a total population of 16,216.

References

Wards of Dodoma Region